Dunan is a settlement on the south shore of the sea loch, Loch na Cairidh near Broadford, on the island of Skye in  Scotland and is in the council area of Highland.

References

Populated places in the Isle of Skye